Melinda Szvorda (born 5 August 1980) is a Hungarian football goalkeeper, currently playing for FC Südburgenland in the Austrian Frauenliga. She has been a member of the Hungarian national team.

References

1980 births
Living people
Hungarian women's footballers
Women's association football goalkeepers
Viktória FC-Szombathely players
FC Südburgenland players
ŽNK Mura players
ÖFB-Frauenliga players
Expatriate women's footballers in Slovenia
Expatriate women's footballers in Austria
Hungary women's international footballers